The Brownwood Independent School District is a public school district in Brownwood, Texas (USA). It was established in 1883.

It is best known as the longtime home of high school football coach Gordon Wood, who during his career won nine state championships, seven of them at Brownwood.

In 2009, the school district was rated "recognized" by the Texas Education Agency.

Schools

Grades 9-12 
Brownwood High School

Grades 7-8 
Brownwood Middle School

Grades 5-6 
Brownwood Intermediate School

Grade 4 
Coggin Fourth Grade

Grades K-3 
East Elementary
Northwest Elementary
Woodland Heights Elementary
2005 National Blue Ribbon School

References

External links 
 

School districts in Brown County, Texas
School districts established in 1883